Jed Adcock (born 15 November 1985) is a former professional Australian rules footballer and current coach who played for the  and  in the Australian Football League (AFL). He was co-captain of the Brisbane Lions in 2013 and sole captain in 2014. After moving back to Brisbane in 2017 following separation from his first wife, he became the assistant midfield coach at the Brisbane Lions and still remains in that position.

AFL career
He was recruited as the number 33 draft pick in the 2003 AFL Draft from the North Ballarat Rebels. He made his debut for the Brisbane Lions in Round 7, 2004 against North Melbourne.

In 2007, Adcock came second (behind Jonathan Brown) in the best and fairest and was also an all Australian 
nominee. He was in the top 10 in the AFL for free kicks and was in the top 15 for tackles. He was a defender at the start of 2007 and then became a midfielder for the lions and kicked a career high four goals at the MCG against Collingwood in round 17 when the lions won by 93 points.

In 2008, Adcock was appointed as one of four vice captains alongside Simon Black, Luke Power and Daniel Merrett.

Adcock played in the first 15 games of 2009 before getting injured. Scans revealed that the injury was a tibial plateau fracture which kept him off the field for 10–12 weeks. He returned for the second semi final against the Western Bulldogs, and played in his first and only final.

In 2013, he became co-captain of the Lions with Jonathan Brown and in January 2014, became the sole captain. After 1 season in job, Adcock stepped down to a mentor role and Tom Rockliff took over as captain.

In August 2015, he was advised he would not be offered a contract extension for 2016, and was subsequently delisted by Brisbane. He was, however, drafted by the Western Bulldogs in the 2016 rookie draft with the 46th selection.

Adcock played his first game for the Bulldogs in round 4, 2016 against . In August, he announced he would retire at the end of the season. He did not feature in the club's premiership win in October. Despite missing out on the AFL grand final, he did play in Footscray's 2016 VFL grand final victory.

Statistics

|- style="background-color: #EAEAEA"
! scope="row" style="text-align:center" | 2004
|
| 7 || 2 || 2 || 2 || 6 || 7 || 13 || 4 || 2 || 1.0 || 1.0 || 3.0 || 3.5 || 6.5 || 2.0 || 1.0
|-
! scope="row" style="text-align:center" | 2005
|
| 7 || 22 || 4 || 2 || 160 || 117 || 277 || 93 || 49 || 0.2 || 0.1 || 7.3 || 5.3 || 12.6 || 4.2 || 2.2
|- style="background-color: #EAEAEA"
! scope="row" style="text-align:center" | 2006
|
| 7 || 8 || 1 || 1 || 98 || 49 || 147 || 50 || 27 || 0.1 || 0.1 || 12.3 || 6.1 || 18.4 || 6.3 || 3.4
|-
! scope="row" style="text-align:center" | 2007
|
| 7 || 22 || 10 || 1 || 277 || 178 || 455 || 98 || 109 || 0.5 || 0.0 || 12.6 || 8.1 || 20.7 || 4.5 || 5.0
|- style="background-color: #EAEAEA"
! scope="row" style="text-align:center" | 2008
|
| 7 || 21 || 6 || 4 || 175 || 170 || 345 || 75 || 95 || 0.3 || 0.2 || 8.3 || 8.1 || 16.4 || 3.6 || 4.5
|-
! scope="row" style="text-align:center" | 2009
|
| 7 || 16 || 4 || 1 || 162 || 152 || 314 || 79 || 68 || 0.3 || 0.1 || 10.1 || 9.5 || 19.6 || 4.9 || 4.3
|- style="background-color: #EAEAEA"
! scope="row" style="text-align:center" | 2010
|
| 7 || 9 || 2 || 1 || 73 || 66 || 139 || 39 || 22 || 0.2 || 0.1 || 8.1 || 7.3 || 15.4 || 4.3 || 2.4
|-
! scope="row" style="text-align:center" | 2011
|
| 7 || 20 || 5 || 2 || 252 || 150 || 402 || 117 || 70 || 0.3 || 0.1 || 12.6 || 7.5 || 20.1 || 5.9 || 3.5
|- style="background-color: #EAEAEA"
! scope="row" style="text-align:center" | 2012
|
| 7 || 21 || 3 || 2 || 244 || 160 || 404 || 104 || 85 || 0.1 || 0.1 || 11.6 || 7.6 || 19.2 || 5.0 || 4.0
|-
! scope="row" style="text-align:center" | 2013
|
| 7 || 22 || 2 || 3 || 290 || 153 || 443 || 93 || 92 || 0.1 || 0.1 || 13.2 || 7.0 || 20.1 || 4.2 || 4.2
|- style="background-color: #EAEAEA"
! scope="row" style="text-align:center" | 2014
|
| 7 || 22 || 3 || 0 || 265 || 142 || 407 || 87 || 63 || 0.1 || 0.0 || 12.0 || 6.5 || 18.5 || 4.0 || 2.9
|-
! scope="row" style="text-align:center" | 2015
|
| 7 || 21 || 17 || 10 || 148 || 110 || 258 || 92 || 67 || 0.8 || 0.5 || 7.0 || 5.2 || 12.2 || 4.4 || 3.2
|- style="background-color: #EAEAEA"
! scope="row" style="text-align:center" | 2016
|
| 44 || 7 || 1 || 1 || 50 || 51 || 101 || 24 || 14 || 0.1 || 0.1 || 7.1 || 7.3 || 14.3 || 3.4 || 2.0
|- class="sortbottom"
! colspan=3| Career
! 213
! 60
! 30
! 2200
! 1505
! 3705
! 955
! 763
! 0.3
! 0.1
! 10.3
! 7.1
! 17.4
! 4.5
! 3.6
|}

Personal life 
Adcock separated from wife Hayley Opel in 2017. He is now married to Amber Ward.

He has four children, two with Opel and two with Ward.

Adcock resides in Brisbane's western suburbs.

References

External links 

1985 births
Living people
Australian rules footballers from Victoria (Australia)
Brisbane Lions players
Greater Western Victoria Rebels players
Maryborough Football Club players
Western Bulldogs players
Brisbane Lions captains